The Canton of Maromme is a former canton situated in the Seine-Maritime département and in the Haute-Normandie region of northern France. It was disbanded following the French canton reorganisation which came into effect in March 2015. It consisted of 2 communes, which joined the canton of Canteleu in 2015. It had a total of 26,013 inhabitants (2012).

Geography 
An area of light industry, forestry and farming situated on the banks of the Seine, immediately west of Rouen in the arrondissement of Rouen. The altitude varies from 2m (Canteleu) to 138m (Canteleu) with an average altitude of 107m.

The canton comprised 2 communes:
Canteleu
Maromme

Population

See also 
 Arrondissements of the Seine-Maritime department
 Cantons of the Seine-Maritime department
 Communes of the Seine-Maritime department

References

Maromme
2015 disestablishments in France
States and territories disestablished in 2015